Mhadere Tigabe (born 1992) is Ethiopian beauty pageant titleholder who was crowned Miss Universe Ethiopia 2013, and was represented Ethiopia at Miss Universe 2013 pageant.

Miss Universe Ethiopia 2013
Mhadere Tigabe has bested other 14 contestants to be crowned Miss Universe Ethiopia 2013 at the conclusion of the pageant held on September 20, 2013, at the Radisson Blu hotel in Addis Ababa. She was represented Ethiopia in the Miss Universe 2013 pageant in Moscow, Russia.

Personal life
Tigabe, from Addis Ababa, attended Mekelle University, Ethiopia studying Mechanical engineering. She is a black belt in taekwondo and has experience of tutoring children.

References

External links
Official Miss Universe Ethiopia website

1992 births
Living people
Ethiopian beauty pageant winners
People from Addis Ababa
Miss Universe 2013 contestants
Ethiopian female models
Mekelle University alumni